Impulsora del Deportivo Necaxa S.A. de C.V.; often simply known as Necaxa, is a Mexican professional football club in Liga MX based in the city of Aguascalientes. It plays in the Estadio Victoria.

History

Foundation (Light and Power Company, Luz y Fuerza) (1899–1920)
Necaxa was founded on 21 August 1923 by Scotsman William H. Fraser, an engineer and owner of the Light and Power Company (Compañía de Luz y Fuerza) in the state of Puebla. As a student in the United Kingdom Fraser played football and was a strong advocate for the sport.  Fraser consolidated the teams of the Light and Power Company and the Street Car operators Compañia de Luz y Fuerza and Tranvías into one.

Fraser supported the newly merged team with company revenue and funds. In addition, the Light and Power Company offered steady employment to players in an era where half of the players were playing at an amateur level. However, the Mexican football federation did not allow teams to be named after private companies, so the team changed its name to Necaxa, after the Necaxa River that was close to the electrical plant.

Historians assert that the colors and Necaxa's crest came from following the arrival of the Cornish community in Mexico, the Cornish community flourished and stayed in Central Mexico until the Mexican Revolution in 1910. Although the Cornish community in Mexico broadly returned to Cornwall, they left a cultural legacy; Cornish pasties, Cornish mining museums, a Cornish Mexican Cultural Society and football, are part of the local heritage and tradition in and around Mineral del Monte.
In 1923, it was decided Necaxa team would field players regardless of race and nationality.

In that era, the team was called "Los Electricistas" (The Electricians). The team adopted the colors red and white as their team colors, earning them the nickname "Los roji-blancos". During this period, the oldest rivalry in Mexican football began to form, between Necaxa and Atlante F.C.

On 14 September 1930, having already been a 2-time champion of the amateur Copa Eliminatoria, Necaxa inaugurated its stadium named Parque Necaxa, located on the banks of La Piedad River on land donated by the Fraser Family. The stadium had a maximum capacity for 15,000 fans, and was known for its clock tower displaying the team's emblem.

Necaxa, in the early days of Mexican Football were members of the Mexican Amateur Association Football League Liga Mexicana de Fútbol Amateur Association, composed of Atlante F.C., Club España, Germania FV, and seasoned and disciplined team Asturias. Necaxa won championships during the 1932–33, 1934–35, 1936–37, 1937–38. seasons.

The following season after the stadium's opening, players such as Hilario López and Luis Pérez contributed to the team's success, leading Necaxa to the League final against Atlante, losing 3–2.

But Necaxa would rebound the next season, smashing Atlante by a 9–0 score. The line-up Necaxa used on that day was the following: 

During this decade, Necaxa became one of the most popular teams in Mexico. Under the direction of the Ernst Pauler, Necaxa, in one season of play (1935–36), the team dominated and won titles ranging from Champion of Champions, Champion of the Liga Mayor De La Ciudad, National Champion of League, National Champion and Central American Champions. Their last title was the Central American Championship in El Salvador.

1935 Caribbean games lineup

Mexico

"Paco" Martinez de la Vega, an aficionado, would coin the surname for the very first time "Campeonismo" or "Championshipism", which Necaxa would later use to justify their achievements and titles.

Late 1930s: Once Hermanos
Following the Mexican Revolution, the late 1930s represented Necaxa's most successful all-Mexican team. The Once Hermanos or "Eleven Brothers" period was coined in that era due to that team's ability to work as a team. The Necaxa team, in 1936, won the Copa México.

In that same year, a talented striker gained popularity within Necaxa's benches.  Even though he was not one of the original "once hermano" or "eleventh brother" Horacio Casarìn, was a great player in the Mexican league national ranks. His success took him to the big screen in Mexican Cinema.

Necaxa's "Once Hermanos" lineup

1940s brief hiatus
Necaxa disappears from competitive play within the Mexican League in 1943 altogether due to the professionalization of Mexican Football. It would be half a decade before the Necaxa emblem and uniform would be represented on the field again.

1950-60s resurgence
Seven years later, Club Necaxa returned to play under the conditions of the commercialization of the Mexican league. Under the new ownership of the Union of Electricians and Juan Jose Rivas Rojas, Club Necaxa played their first game on 25 September 1950 in the old district of Oblatos, in a stadium called Parque Oblatos or "Oblatos Stadium" otherwise called the Municipal Stadium of Felipe Martinez Sandoval in Guadalajara, Mexico. This park inaugurated Necaxa's comeback to football. In the fifties, Necaxa were tenants and played in the Federal District of Mexico City in present-day Estadio Azul (1950–55).

In the late sixties, Necaxa played football in Estadio Azteca in Mexico City. A modern lighting system in Estadio Azetca was inaugurated on 5 June 1966 with the first night game between Valencia CF and Necaxa. The first goal of the game was scored by Honduran José Cardona. In this game Roberto Martínez o Caña Brava scored the first goal made by a Mexican. Estadio Azteca was the largest stadium in Latin America, and the fifth largest stadium in the world. It is known throughout North America and South America as the home stadium for the Mexico national football team.

Throughout the 1950s Necaxa struggled financially to keep afloat. In 1955, large debts obliged Necaxa to sell the majority of its star players. Miguel Ramierz Vazquez a new owner, contracted the services of the Uruguayan coach Donald Ross, who eventually took Guadalajara to a championship 1957, beginning a road to stability, yet not winning championships.

The electricians won the Title cup in 1960 and the following year, in the Universidad Nacional Autonoma de Mexico Olympic stadium, "the electricians" defeated Rey Pele and the club and team of the Santos of Brazil 4–3 in an official match of that year's "Exagonal" tournament. "Morocho" Dante Juarez assisted in two victorious goals in Necaxa's win over the Santos de Brazil.

Through the early 1960s, Necaxa struggled financially until it was sold. New owners,Julio Orvañanos brought a championship in 1965–66.

Mexico 68 and Carlos Albert vs Necaxa
In this decade, the organization was in financial trouble. The team had poor attendance in Mexico City due to the population unrest.

The case of Carlos Albert begins with a small group of veteran footballers in the spring of 1969. Club Necaxa Veteran players petitioned the organization for better wages and argued that as a team and group, they have always responded to the team's performance. Carlos Albert was the face of the disagreement between the players and management.

Albert was listed by Necaxa Management as transferable and was retained on half his salary. He asked management to void his contract in order, to avoid loss of income and to be able to continue playing in the League with another team. Necaxa Management did not accept his request.

The courts ruled in favour of Albert on Thursday 8 October 1971, and Necaxa was forced to pay MX$77,000 to Carlos Albert.  Due to the will of managements unfair psychological abuse and labour malpractice, This case forced a cause to action from several players to request better treatment and more rights for Necaxa football players.

Atlético Español 1971 to 1982
On 19 September 1971, Club Necaxa experienced financial trouble and became in debt with players and management. The owners sold the club to a group of businessmen from Spain. The ownership handled the player contracts, disputes and the franchises debt. The new Spanish ownership restructured contracts and made Club Necaxa solvent. The club plays under the name of the Spanish Athletic Bulls or "Toros del Atlético Español".

In 1975, the organization won their only international title in the CONCACAF Champions' Cup, playing the final against Transvaal of Suriname and defeating them 5–1 on aggregate. In 1973–74, they reached the final against Cruz Azul. They played a two-legged tie in which the Atlético Español won the first leg 2–1 but lost the second 3–0, becoming sub champion of the league.

Players who distinguished themselves in Atlético Español were the Brazilian striker Carlos Eloir Perucci, Ricardo Brandón, Salvador Plascencia,'Sabanita' Rivera, Juan Santillán, and Tomás Boy, under the direction of Miguel Marín, 'the Witch' Gutiérrez,
Enrique Díaz and 'Chucho' Prado and the Chiliean Prieto.

In 1982, the Spanish ownership within the Federal District of Mexico city sold the franchise. A new group of Mexican businessmen purchased Necaxa in 1982, then telecommunications Giant Grupo Televisa returned the organization's original name from 1971 and opened its training facilities in Cuautitlán Izcalli in the state of Mexico. The ownership renamed the franchise Necaxa by 1982 after the cultural and historical importance of the franchise in Mexican football. While Mexico experienced a crisis called "the Lost Decade" or "La Decada Perdida" in the 1980s and early 1970s, Necaxa in the 1980s struggled against two relegation matches. One at the end of the 1982–83 season against Zacatepec and another by the end of the 1984–85 season against Leones Universidad de Guadalajara.

Atlético Español footballers:
Goalkeepers: Julito Aguilar, Jan Gomola, Goyo Cortez, Enrique Vazquez del Mercado, Defense: El Pimienta Rico, Juan Manuel Alvarez, Mario Trejo, Midfielder: Juan Carlos Rodriguez Vega, Manuel Manzo, Benito Buen Hombre Pardo, Tomas Boy. Forwards: Juan Manuel Borbolla, J.J. Muñante, Romano, Carlos Eloir Perucci, El Cachito Ramirez, Ricardo Brandon, Pio Tabaré Gonzalez, Juan Carlos Rossete. Raúl 'El Cora Isiordia", y Alejandro Romanh.

New Owners and return to glory (1990–2000)
In 1988, Futbol Club Necaxa was purchased by Mexican telecommunications giant Grupo Televisa S.A C.V.  The now late owner, Emilio Azcárraga Milmo (father of Emilio Azcárraga Jean), and several associates took a new direction with the team.

In the 1989 and 1990 season, director of football operations Anibal Ruiz acquired the services of the Ecuadorian midfielder, Álex Aguinaga, one of the iconic figures of the Necaxa in the 1990s and one of the most talented foreign players who has ever set foot on Mexican soil.

Necaxa has a great season, previously in the 1980s they battled twice against México Primera División's regulations of the Mexican League. In that year Necaxa reached the finals losing to Pumas of the University of Mexico. The following season Aníbal Ruiz was replaced with new coach, the Argentine ex-defender, Eduardo Luján Manera who contracted the services of the Chilean Ivo Basay. Under Manera, Necaxa didn't qualify for the finals of the championship. The acquisition of new coach Roberto Saporiti, marked the beginning of a commitment to competition excellence in a period known to Necaxa fans as "La Epoca Necaxista bajo el Capitalismo" or "the new era of Necaxa under Capitalism".

In 1992, the talented footballer of UNAM, ex-Puma player Enrique Borja was put under contract and headed the club's football operations, leaving Saporiti as head coach of Necaxa. Eventually Saporitti was replaced. The team Saporitti, Manera, Ruiz leave was an offensive minded team, that was disciplined, yet lacked great defensive talent.  The following season management engaged the services of Manuel Lapuente. Sergio "El Ratón" Zarate, Octavio "Picas" Becerril, the Chilean Eduardo "Lalo" Vilches, José María "El Chema" Higareda were key figures in the defense and offense of the club. Manuel Lapuente managed Club Necaxa to three Championship titles in Mexico's National Football League.

After 56 years, once again Necaxa found itself with the title of "Campeonísimo", contributing talent in the 1990s and late in the millennium, within the Primera División of the Mexican League and in the Mexico national team.

They won the Mexican League Championship in 1994 (beating Cruz Azul), in 1995 (beating Celaya) and 1998 (beating Guadalajara), becoming Champion of CONCACAF and champion of champions the legacy of the "Once Hermanos" attempted to be reestablished within the franchise's values and mind set. The Necaxa team of the 1990s and represented the cohesion and ability of working and playing as a team under lucrative financial incentives, forced great communication on the field and execution on the field during advanced Capitalism competition play. Necaxa's Championships were similar, yet different reminder of the spirit of "Los Once Hermanos" or "the Eleven Brothers" in the late 1930s.

Relocation and new home (2000–2009)
After poor attendance numbers during the early 2000s, Necaxa needed to refresh their home and relocate to improve on this issue. Many considered Estadio Victoria in Aguascalientes to be the first modern stadium built in Mexico.

Attendance continued to decline steadily despite the change of city and stadium for Necaxa. This consistent decline would lead to a relegation for Necaxa during the Spring 2009 campaign.

The Hidrorayos would bounce back winning the fall 2009 and Spring 2010 (undefeated) Ascenso MX titles thus earning an automatic promotion back up to the Liga MX.

Necaxa in Primera División and return to Ascenso MX (2011–present)
After winning the 2009–10 promotion, Necaxa returned to the FMF Primera División for the 2010–11 campaign. Omar Arellano began the season with Daniel Brailovsky taking over for the remainder of the tenure. Ultimately the club faced immediate relegation after only one year.

Despite having a good performance in the 2nd division, Necaxa was initially unable to return to the top flight, losing two finals in 2013 against Neza FC and Universidad de Guadalajara.

On 6 December 2014, Necaxa won the Apertura 2014 championship in the final game against Coras de Tepic ultimately losing the promotion play-off against Dorados de Sinaloa.

The Apertura 2015 tournament was not good for Necaxa, finishing in 10th place.  However, in Clausura 2016, Necaxa finished the regular season as runner-up, one point behind U. de G.  In the playoffs, Necaxa beat Correcaminos 2–1 in the Quarterfinals, Atlante 5–3 in the Semifinals, and Zacatecas 2–0 in the Finals to become champion. Next was a two-legged playoff series against Cd. Juarez, the Apertura 2015 champion. Necaxa won the first leg in Aguascalientes 1–0, and one week later in Cd. Juarez 2–0, thus clinching its return to Primera Division Liga MX for the first time in five years.

NX Football USA, LLC (2021–present)
Necaxa took in a 50% ownership partner named NX Football USA, LLC in 2021. The ownership group included former owners from Major League Soccer club D.C. United, former managers from English Football club Swansea City, and celebrities: Mexican-American actress Eva Longoria, international football player Mesut Özil, former NBA basketball player Shawn Marion, MLB baseball player Justin Verlander, and American model Kate Upton.

Sponsorship

 Championship jerseys

First kit evolution

1990–present kit evolution

Honours

Domestic

Confederation

Qualifier

Personnel

Management

Coaching staff

Players

First-team squad

Out on loan

Reserve teams

Necaxa (Liga TDP)
Reserve team that plays in the Liga TDP, the fourth level of the Mexican league system.

Historical championship squads

Top scorers

Historical Amateur leading scorers
 1926–27  Miguel Ruiz (13 Goals)
 1931–32  Julio Lores (20 Goals)
 1932–33  Julio Lores (8 Goals)
 1934–35  Hilario López (17 Goals)
 1936–37  Julio Lores (7 Goals)

Historical Leading Season scorers

 1950–51  Horacio Casarín (17 Goals)
 1952–53  Tulio Quiñones (14 Goals)
 1953–54  Julio María Palleiro (21 Goals)
 1954–55  Julio María Palleiro (19 Goals)
 1983–84  Norberto Outes (28 Goals)
 1992–93  Ivo Basay (27 Goals)
 Verano 2000  Agustín Delgado (14 Goals)
 Apertura 2012  Víctor Lojero (11 Goals)
 Clausura 2013  Víctor Lojero (12 Goals)
 Apertura 2019  Mauro Quiroga (12 Goals)

All-time leading scorers

Managers
This is the list of managers who had the Club Necaxa in short tournaments:

Fan clubs
Sobredosis Albirroja "The Red and White Overdose"
Comando Rojiblanco
La Popular
Pasión Albirroja

References

Sources

 ESPN
 La serie Mexico Nuevo Siglo: Rueda de la Fortuna Los Rayos
 Juan Cid y Mulet: Libro de Oro del Fútbol Mexicano – Tomo 2
 Editorial
 IFFHS All-Time Club World Ranking

External links

 

 
Football clubs in Aguascalientes
Association football clubs established in 1923
Ascenso MX teams
Liga MX teams
1923 establishments in Mexico
Primera Fuerza teams
N
N